The Canadian Identification Society (CIS) is a bilingual (English- French) professional non-for-profit fellowship of police officers and civilian members who share interests and employment in crime scene investigation.

The CIS was officially created under Part II of the Canada Corporations Act on November 13, 1977, following the signature of the Letters Patent.  The founding members of the CIS were:
 Lloyd Dunham
 Christopher D. Tiller
 Howard Hall
 Clayton Bigras
 Roger Remillard
 Richard Jordon
 Allen Wrenshall
 Donald Braithwaite
 Harold G. Tuthill
 Donald Guttman
 Ronald Duck

Although the Society is mainly a Canadian organization including more than eight hundred (800) members through Canada, it also gathers members of the United States of America, Australia, United Kingdom as well as others international communities.

Mission and goals 

The Canadian Identification Society (CIS) is a professional association for those engaged in forensic identification, investigation, and scientific examination of physical evidence.

The CIS supports continuing research in all areas of forensic science and aims to keep members informed and current by providing excellent training opportunities and links to educational resources.  It has served its members by encouraging forensic identification specialists to share their knowledge and experience.

President list 

Christopher D. Tiller (1977–1978)
Scott J.J. Raybould (1978–1979)
C.F. Cecil Brown (1979–1980)
Donald Nelson (1980–1981)
William R. Pryde (1981–1982)
Archie G.A. Purgavie (1982–1983)
John E. Duncan (1983–1984)
S.H. Sim Wentzell (1984–1985)
Robert L. Bridgewater (1985–1986)
Kenneth J. Collier (1986–1987)
William Donald Dixon (1987 - +) 
Spencer M. Hilton (1987–1988)
Ross E. Reed (1988–1989)
Donald F. Taylor (1989–1990)
H. Gregg McKinnon (1990–1991)
James R. McConnell (1991–1992)
Anthony J. Bouwmeester (1992–1993)
Janet N. Holt (1993–1994)
Ronald E. Yeomans (1994–1995)
Herbert J.M. Durand (1995–1996)
Bryan Amos (1996–1997)
J.D. Bert Hudon (1997–1998)
Robert B. Kennedy (1998–1999)
Brent Walker (1999–2000)
Scott Brown (2000–2001)
Henry Kinsella (2001–2002)
John P. (Pat) Downey (2002–2003)
Glen Saunders (2003–2004)
Mary Beeton (2004–2005)
Grant Boulay (2005–2006)
Paul Gagnon (2006–2007)
Shelly Massey (2007–2008)
Alexandre Beaudoin (2008–2009)
Matthew Lewandowski (2009–2010)
Stuart Wyatt (2010 - 2011)
Wade Knaap (2011-2012)
Shawna Laird (2012-2013)
John Aitkenhead (2013-2014)

+ = Deceased while president

Awards

The Tiller Award 

Christopher D. Tiller, one of the founding members of the CIS, created the Tiller Award for CIS members who have demonstrated excellence in law enforcement photography. This award is offered on an annual basis. Only members in good standing with the CIS are eligible to apply.

Recipients: 
Archie G.A. Purgavie
Brian Ward
Angus Noseworthy
Kenneth Lugg
David Zauner
Carey Smith
David Banks
Wayne Harnum
David E. Black
Gary Leydier
Al Misner
David J. Hamer
Alexander D. McMurrich
Douglas Handy
Ronald M. Gilbert
Leonard B. Shaw
Robert B. Kennedy
Joseph Slemko
W. Derrick Swiderski
William B. Benjamin
Suki Thind
Michael Reid
Sharon Smith
John D. Stewart 
Alexandre Beaudoin
Bruce Hamblin
Grant Boulay

The Edward Foster Award 

This award is named after Edward Foster, the founder of the fingerprint system in Canada, and is intended to encourage CIS members to conduct research that shall benefit the Forensic Identification profession.  This award point out the great contribution of the recipient to Forensic Identification field in his career.

Recipients: 
Brian E. Dalrymple
Harold G. Tuthill
Robert A. McPherson
Jack Milligan
Maurice E. Wolff
Paul Morin
David Ashbaugh
Robert B. Kennedy
Pat Laturnus
Maurice Nadeau
Alexandre Beaudoin
Della Wilkinson

The William Donald Dixon memorial research and essay Awards 

William Donald Dixon, one of the founding members of the Canadian Identification Society, created two research awards, each in the amount of $500.00 (Canadian), for individuals engaged in forensic research.

Recipients: 
John Badowski (1989)
Byron Ferguson (1990)
David Ashbaugh (1991)
Ron Yeomans (1994)
Tara Nicholls (2000)
Zain Bhaloo (2009)
Requell Weisbrod (2011)

The Michael J. Cassidy Award 

Michael J. Cassidy made significant contributions to footwear comparison and identification. This award is intended to encourage professionalism and innovation in footwear evidence recovery and identification, by recognizing excellence in footwear comparison. Only members in good standing with the CIS are eligible to apply.

Recipients: 
Wayne Harnum
Don Hulsman
Rob Gervais
Shelly Massey
Bruce Hamblin

The Jack Milligan achievement Award 

Jack Milligan is one of the early founding members of the Canadian Identification Society. Three awards, in the amount of $500.00, $300.00 and $200.00 (Canadian), are available for CIS members that have been recognized by their peers for their outstanding achievements in the field of fingerprints. The award can be cash, a voucher, or can be put toward a sponsorship to attend a future Annual Educational CIS Conference.

Recipients: 
RCMP – Ottawa Latent Fingerprint Bureau
Bradley J. Butler
CIS Friction Ridge Certification Committee (John Aitkenhead, Shawna Laird, Jean Séguin, Ralph Gutoskie)

Journal 

The organisation's quarterly publication, Identification Canada, is a peer-reviewed 40-page colour Journal. This journal is, for the most part, bilingual. It is a means of distributing findings on hi-tech methods and ideas from both technological and scientific fields of the forensic sciences, as well as, a venue for communicating training opportunities and the business of the Society.

Editors
Lloyd Dunham (1977–1978)
Ivan Brown (1978–1979)
L.M. Schulhauser (1979–1981)
Jack Milligan (1981–1989)
Neala Taylor (1989–2002)
Della Wilkinson (2002-2012)
Wade Knaap (2012 -)

Annual Educational Conference 

Each year, the Canadian Identification Society provides a venue which brings together persons in the forensic professions.  This Annual Educational CIS Conference is held by police forces of a different city in Canada.

1978 – Ottawa – Royal Canadian Mounted Police/Canadian Police College 
1979 – Regina – Regina Police Service
1980 – Peterborough - Peterborough Police Department 
1981 – Vancouver – Vancouver Police Department
1982 – Montreal – Service de police de la Ville de Montréal
1983 – Calgary – Calgary Police Service
1984 - St-John's – Royal Newfoundland Constabulary 
1985 – Winnipeg – Winnipeg Police Service
1986 – Burlington – Halton Regional Police Service
1988 – Toronto Metro – Toronto Police Service 
1989 – Edmonton – Edmonton Police Service 
1990 – Capital Region - 9 Dept's 
1991 – Saint John - Saint John Police Department 
1992 – Hamilton - Hamilton-Wentworth Regional Police Service 
1993 – Vancouver – Vancouver Police Department 
1994 – Windsor - Windsor Police Department / Michigan-Ontario Identification Association 
1995 – Halifax – Royal Canadian Mounted Police 
1996 – Orillia – Ontario Provincial Police 
1997 – Edmonton – Edmonton Police Service 
1998 – Kitchener – Conestoga College 
1999 – Fredericton – Royal Canadian Mounted Police 
2000 – Vancouver - Delta Police Department
2001 – Ottawa – Ottawa Police Service 
2002 – Mississauga – University of Toronto at Mississauga 
2003 – Ottawa - Canadian Identification Society / International Association for Identification 
2004 - St-John's – Royal Newfoundland Constabulary 
2005 – Calgary – Calgary Police Service 
2006 – Windsor – University of Windsor / Canadian Society of Forensic Science / Canadian Identification Society 
2007 – Montreal – Sûreté du Québec 
2008 – Halifax – Atlantic Canada Death Investigators / Canadian Society of Forensic Science / Canadian Identification Society 
2009 - Vancouver - British Columbia Institute of Technology / New Westminster Police Service
2010 - Orillia – Ontario Provincial Police
2011 – Ottawa – Royal Canadian Mounted Police
2012 - Calgary - Calgary Police Service
2013 – Richmond, B.C. - Canadian Identification Society
2014 – Toronto - Canadian Identification Society

See also 
Forensics

References 

Identification Canada Journal. 30(3) 2007 pp120
Triplett M, Fingerprint Dictionary, Two Rings Publishing, Bellevue, Washington, 22.
Canadian Identification Society Website

External links 
Canadian Identification Society

Law enforcement agencies of Canada
Criminal investigation
Law enforcement in Canada
Forensics organizations
Organizations established in 1977
Scientific societies based in Canada
1977 establishments in Canada